Khorrami is a village in Iran. Khorrami, Khurami or Khorami may also refer to
Khorrami (surname)
Khorrami Rural District in Iran
Lay-e Khorrami, a village in Iran